MinnMax is an online entertainment company based in Minnesota that focuses on "games, friends, and getting better." MinnMax's flagship content is the weekly video podcast The MinnMax Show, which focuses on video game reviews and previews, industry news, and community questions. The company's output also includes livestreamed personality-driven videos, interviews with professionals in various fields, and documentaries. The company is led by Ben Hanson, one of four founding members and host of The MinnMax Show, with a rotating cast of Cohorts, Contributors, and Friends of MinnMax additionally contributing to content. The company is crowdfunded via Patreon, with different contribution tiers offering various incentives, such as receiving the weekly podcast a day early.

History and operations 
In August of 2019, Game Informer laid off a number of their editorial staff. Ben Hanson, host of The Game Informer Show podcast at the time, was not included in the layoffs, but became disillusioned with working for a large corporation like GameStop and left the company several months later. On 24 October 2019, the same day Hanson left Game Informer, he launched MinnMax as a Patreon along with Kyle Hilliard, Suriel Vazquez, and Jeff Marchiafava, all of whom had been laid off by Game Informer in August. The stated goal was to create a sustainable, supporter-funded video game media outlet with a larger focus on video content and community-building. By receiving funding directly from supporters via Patreon, the company was specifically designed not to be beholden to corporate interests.

In addition to their flagship podcast, The MinnMax Show, a key part of MinnMax's initial pitch to supporters was game club-style content called The Deepest Dive. The first Deepest Dive discussed The Outer Worlds over multiple episodes, with community members writing in with comments and questions about the game.

On 10 August 2020, Hanson interviewed former Visceral Games developers Zach Mumbach and Ben Wander, leading several video game websites to report details about a cancelled Star Wars game, Project Ragtag, that came to light in the interview. This started a trend of details from MinnMax interviews being picked up by notable media outlets, including information about Fall Guys, Wii U, WWE, God of War Ragnarök, and more.

On 16 October 2020, MinnMax released Trailheads: The Oregon Trail's Origins Documentary, which received attention from both video game and local news outlets. The documentary was a project Hanson started in 2009 "while working for a community television station in Roseville," with most of the featured footage having been captured years before its release. MinnMax's only other documentary-style video since then has been The Oral History of PopCap Games, which released on 5 April 2021, though Hanson has expressed interest in producing more documentaries.

Every month beginning in February 2021, MinnMax livestreams a video game trivia show called Trivia Tower, open to all members of the Patreon to play as contestants. Notably, MinnMax has hosted two special editions called Trivia Tower All-Stars, which brings together various members of the video game media to compete instead of Patreon members, with 100% of the prize going to the winner's charity of choice. Similarly, MinnMax has hosted several special editions of Trivia Tower in collaboration with other media outlets, which include stakes based on which community wins.

Every November since 2020, MinnMax has hosted a livestream participating in Extra Life, a fundraising event for the Children's Miracle Network Hospitals. Besides the MinnMax staff, these streams have included collaborations with former MinnMax collaborators, current and former Game Informer staff, and Easy Allies creators.

Since 2022, MinnMax has been included in the voting jury of The Game Awards.

Name 
The company's name references the practice of  min-maxing in video games, as well as Minnesota, the company's primary state of operations. The two Ns in MinnMax are frequently noted in the outlet's content, with even their game of the year list, The Two Tens, referencing the letters. Furthermore, some of the company's content riffs on the name, such as MinnFAQs, MinnSnax, and Max Spoilers.

Games of the year
Each year, MinnMax produces special episodes of the podcast called The MinnMax Awards. In these episodes, specific category awards are chosen, such as "Best Thing" and "Greatest Work of Art of All Time". Furthermore, a list known as The Two Tens ranks the ten best games of the year (the first ten), as well as the next ten best games of the year (the second ten). Below are the games MinnMax has listed as number one on the first ten each year.

Recurring shows 

The following table lists most of MinnMax's recurring shows, in order of their first appearance.

Deepest Dives
The following table lists all of MinnMax's Deepest Dives, in the order they were released.

Notable New Show Plus Series
The following are series that have been featured in New Show Plus three or more times, sorted by first appearance.

Notes

References

External links 
 

Internet properties established in 2019
2019 establishments in Minnesota
Video game podcasts
Patreon creators